The 2007 AFC Asian Cup qualification was held in late 2005 and the final qualification round was held from February to November 2006 with 25 nations participating.

For the first time, the defending champions (Japan), did not earn an automatic berth in the finals and had to compete in the qualification tournament. Twelve teams from top two of each groups joined with four host nations (Indonesia, Malaysia, Thailand and Vietnam) qualify for the final tournament.

Teams that did not enter
16 national teams did not enter qualifying (The team's FIFA World Ranking was considered for November 2005):

 [116]
 [133]
 [141]
 [147]
 [157]
 [170]
 [175]
 [179]
 [188]
 [189]
 [190]
 [191]
 [192]
 [199]
 [204]
 East Timor [Not yet ranked]

Team excluded
 [82] were banned from qualifying after having been found guilty of improper conduct in the qualifying round for 2004.

Thus, out of 46 national teams, 25 entered the qualifying.

Preliminary round
In December 2005, Bangladesh and Pakistan played off in a home and away series (with Bangladesh hosting the first leg), to determine which team would progress to the final qualifying round. This was originally scheduled in November but the earthquake in Pakistan forced it to be postponed.

After a goalless first leg in Bangabandhu National Stadium, Dhaka, Bangladesh on 22 December 2005, Bangladesh won the second leg thanks to the goal from Firoz Mahmud Titu at the 84-minute in People's Sports Complex, Karachi, Pakistan four days later. Bangladesh qualified with the 1–0 on aggregate. However, Pakistan ended up also being qualified into the final qualifying round anyway, after Sri Lanka withdrew.

 qualified with the 1–0 on aggregate.  also qualified after  withdrew.

Seedings
The seeding was based on the 2004 competition, including results during qualifying. The teams in their respective pots also are listed with respect to their performance. Note that Jordan and Uzbekistan were placed higher than South Korea and Iraq. For the tie-breaker here served the fact that Jordan and Uzbekistan were eliminated on penalty shootout, while the other two teams were clearly defeated. Uzbekistan precedes Jordan as it won its group, while Jordan placed second. The same principle is applied to the rest of the teams on the list. The Australian team which had just joined the Asian Football Confederation on 1 January 2006 and had not participated in previous tournaments was given the lowest rank.

* = Replace Sri Lanka

Tie-breaking criteria
If two or more teams in a group are equal on points on completion of the group matches, their places shall be determined as follows:
 Greater number of points obtained in the group matches between the teams concerned.
 Goal difference resulting from the group matches between the teams concerned.
 Greater number of goals scored in the group matches between the teams concerned (Away Goals do not apply in this stage of the competition).
 Goal difference in all the group matches.
 Kicks from the penalty mark if only two teams are involved and they are both on the field of play.
 Drawing of lots.

Qualifying round
Pakistan is added back into the final qualifying round after Sri Lanka withdrew at the last minute.
24 teams will be split into six groups of four, playing in a home and away format. The top two of each group will progress to the finals. Matches will start on 22 February 2006 and ends on 15 November 2006.
On 1 August 2006, Lebanon officially withdrew from the competition after having played only one match, due to their ongoing conflict with Israel.

Group A

Group B

Group C

Group D

Note: Bahrain is ranked higher than Kuwait by the two head-to-head game results (Bahrain 2 – 1 Kuwait).

1 On 1 August 2006, it was announced that the AFC had accepted a withdrawal request from the Federation Libanaise de Football due to the 2006 Israel-Lebanon conflict.

The results of the Lebanon-Kuwait game on 22 February 2006 have been declared null and void and do not count towards the group rankings.

The following fixtures were also canceled:
against Bahrain, 16 August 2006 (in Bahrain National Stadium, Manama, Bahrain)
against Australia, 31 August 2006 (in Adelaide Oval, Adelaide, Australia)
against Bahrain, 6 September 2006 (in Beirut Municipal Stadium, Beirut, Lebanon)
against Kuwait, 11 October 2006 (in National Stadium, Kuwait City, Kuwait)
against Australia, 15 November 2006 (in Beirut Municipal Stadium, Beirut, Lebanon)

Group E

Note: Iraq is ranked higher than China PR by the two head-to-head game results (Iraq 3 – 2 China PR).

1 All Iraq's home matches played in Al Ayn, United Arab Emirates.
2 All Palestine's home matches played in Amman, Jordan.

Group F

Qualified teams 

1 Bold indicates champion for that year
2 Italic indicates host
3 Vietnam's debut since the unification of Vietnam at 1975
4 As South Vietnam

Goal scorers

4 Goals
  Yasser Al-Qahtani

3 Goals
  Kazuki Ganaha
  Saleh Bashir
  Essa Al Mahyani

2 Goals
  Hisato Satō
  Ryūji Bando
  Mohammad Al-Shalhoub
  Al Suwaileh
  Al Sawailh
  Mohamed Amin Didi
  Ali Al-Nono
  Mehrzad Madanchi
  Javad Nekounam
  Ali Karimi

1 Goal
  Firaj Mahmud
  Shinji Ono
  Seiichiro Maki
  Takashi Fukunishi
  Tatsuhiko Kubo
  Yuki Abe
  Kengo Nakamura
  Marcus Tulio Tanaka
  N.S. Manju
  Al Hagbani
  Hassan Muath Fallatah
  Saleem Abdullah
  Fekri Al-Hubaishi
  Al-Haggam
  Andranik Teymourian
  Ali Daei
  Vahid Hashemian
  Mohammad Nosrati
  Reza Enayati
  Hossein Badamaki

References

External links
Qualifying Round Results 
RSSSF details

2007
Qual
Qual
Qual